Exit permit may refer to:
Visa (document)#Exit visas
One-way Permit, in China